The Blacks can refer to:

 The Blacks (film), a 2009 Croatian film
 The Blacks (play), a play by the French dramatist Jean Genet
 The Blacks (band), an American alt country band

See also
 Blacks (disambiguation)